Wayne Wahrman, sometimes credited as Wayne P. Wahrman or Wayne R. Wahrman, is a film editor. He has worked on over twenty films in a career that has lasted more than three decades.

Filmography
 Tunnel Vision (1976) 
 Going Back (1984) 
 Kickboxer (1989)
 The Perfect Weapon (1991)
 Street Knight (1993)
 Searching for Bobby Fischer (1993)
 Mighty Morphin Power Rangers: The Movie (1995)
 2 Days in the Valley (1996)
 A Civil Action (1998)
 U-571 (2000)
 Charlie's Angels (2000)
 The Time Machine (2002)
 Charlie's Angels: Full Throttle (2003)
 Constantine (2005)
 All the King's Men (2006)
 I Am Legend (2007)
 The Day the Earth Stood Still (2008)

References

External links

American film editors
Living people
Year of birth missing (living people)